Love, Simon is a 2018 American romantic comedy-drama film directed by Greg Berlanti, written by Isaac Aptaker and Elizabeth Berger, and based on the novel Simon vs. the Homo Sapiens Agenda by Becky Albertalli. The film stars Nick Robinson, Josh Duhamel, and Jennifer Garner. It centers on Simon Spier, a closeted gay high school boy who struggles to balance his friends, his family, and the blackmailer threatening to out him to the entire school, while simultaneously attempting to discover the identity of the anonymous classmate with whom he has fallen in love online.

Love, Simon premiered at the Mardi Gras Film Festival on February 27, 2018, and was released in the United States on March 16, 2018, by 20th Century Fox. Critics praised the film for its "big heart, diverse and talented cast, and revolutionary normalcy", describing it as "tender, sweet, and affecting" and a "hugely charming crowd-pleaser" that is "funny, warm-hearted and life-affirming", with reviews comparing it to the romantic comedy-drama films of John Hughes. Notable as the first film by a major Hollywood studio to focus on a gay teenage romance, it grossed $66million worldwide. A television series titled Love, Victor, set in the same universe as the film, premiered on June 17, 2020, on Hulu, with Robinson serving as the series' narrator for the first season.

Plot

Simon Spier is a closeted gay teenager living in a suburb of Atlanta, Georgia. He has a close and loving family—parents Emily and Jack, and sister Nora—as well as three best friends: Nick and Leah, whom he has known most of his life, and newcomer Abby.

Leah informs Simon about an online confession of a closeted gay student at their high school, known only by the pseudonym "Blue". Simon begins communicating with Blue via email using the pseudonym "Jacques". The two confide personal details and form a connection. Their emails are accidentally discovered by another student, Martin, who is infatuated with Abby. After learning his secret, Martin threatens to make Simon's emails public unless he helps Martin win over Abby. Simon begins trying to figure out which of his classmates is actually Blue.

At a Halloween party, Simon suspects his classmate Bram might be Blue and attempts to connect with him, but later walks in on Bram making out with a female student. Nick confides in Simon that he has feelings for Abby. Simon lies to Nick, telling him that Abby has a boyfriend in college. Leah walks an inebriated Simon home, where she speaks vaguely about how she feels that she is fated to love one person very intensely; Simon believes she is referring to Nick.

Simon meets up with Abby and Martin at a Waffle House after he convinces them to practice lines together for an upcoming school musical. Simon bonds with their server, a classmate named Lyle, and now suspects that Lyle may be Blue. That night, Simon comes out to Abby and is relieved when she reacts positively.

At a school football game, Simon crosses paths with Lyle; before he can summon the courage to ask if Lyle is Blue, he finds out Lyle is actually interested in Abby. An upset Simon tells a pestering Martin to either "go big or go home" when courting Abby. Martin interrupts the national anthem and publicly declares his feelings for Abby. When Abby admits she does not share those feelings, Martin is humiliated and becomes the subject of ridicule.

On Christmas Eve, to distract people from his own humiliation, Martin outs Simon by posting his emails on the school's gossip site. Simon's sister, Nora, tries to comfort Simon but he shuts her out and does not return his friends' texts and calls. Simon comes out to his parents on Christmas morning, to their surprise and acceptance.

After the holidays, Nick and Abby, now a couple, confront Simon about the lies he told and learn that he tried to keep them apart due to Martin's blackmail. Leah confesses to Simon that she was in love with him, not Nick, and is upset he came out to Abby first. After his friends break off from him, Simon receives a final email from Blue, who is upset that their emails have been leaked. Blue tells Simon that they should stop speaking and deletes his email account.

In the cafeteria, Simon and an openly gay student, Ethan, are mocked by classmates. Ethan and Simon bond over the difficulties they have faced coming out. After his mother reaches out and comforts him, Simon apologizes to Leah and tells her he is in love with Blue. Simon posts a confession on the gossip site apologizing to his friends, seeking out Blue and asking him to meet at the school carnival.

After the school musical, Leah, Nick and Abby make amends with Simon and invite him to go to the carnival with them. Waiting for Blue at the carnival, Simon rides the Ferris wheel, drawing a large crowd of peers. When Simon runs out of tickets, Martin buys him one more ride. Just before the ride begins, Bram sits next to Simon, revealing himself as Blue after all; the kiss Simon saw with the female student was a drunken misunderstanding. They ride the Ferris wheel together and kiss as their friends cheer them on.

Simon's life gradually returns to normal and he begins a relationship with Bram. While picking up his friends and boyfriend for school, Simon suggests that they forgo their usual morning routine and instead go "on a little adventure".

Cast
 Nick Robinson as Simon Spier
 Bryson Pitts as 10-year-old Simon Spier
 Nye Reynolds as 5-year-old Simon Spier
 Josh Duhamel as Jack Spier, Simon's father
 Jennifer Garner as Emily Spier, Simon's mother
 Katherine Langford as Leah Burke, one of Simon's best friends 
 Alexandra Shipp as Abby Susso, one of Simon's best friends
 Jorge Lendeborg Jr. as Nick Eisner, one of Simon's best friends
 Keiynan Lonsdale as Abraham "Bram" Greenfeld, Simon's love interest
 Miles Heizer as Cal Price, one of Simon's classmates 
 Logan Miller as Martin Addison, one of Simon's classmates who blackmails him
 Tony Hale as Mr. Worth, the awkward vice principal of the school Simon attends
 Talitha Bateman as Nora Spier, Simon's sister
 Skye Mowbray as 6-year-old Nora Spier
 Natasha Rothwell as Ms. Albright, Simon's drama teacher
 Drew Starkey as Garrett Laughlin, one of Simon's classmates
 Clark Moore as Ethan, one of Simon's classmates who is openly gay
 Joey Pollari as Lyle, a flirty server at a local diner
 Mackenzie Lintz as Taylor Metternich, one of Simon's classmates

Production
Principal photography began on March 6, 2017, in Atlanta, Georgia. Filming officially ended on April 23, 2017, two days earlier than scheduled, an effort that Berlanti made to offset the cost of paying royalties for the most expensive songs on the film's soundtrack.

Becky Albertalli, the author of the novel the film is based on, and YouTuber Doug Armstrong make cameo appearances as students in the film.

Soundtrack

Love, Simon (Original Motion Picture Soundtrack) was released by RCA Records and Sony Music Entertainment, on March 16, 2018. It featured music by several artists including Bleachers, Troye Sivan, Amy Shark, Brenton Wood, The 1975, Normani and Khalid, among others. It featured at #37 on Billboard 200's chart, #3 on Billboard Top Soundtracks chart, and at #24 in Billboard Canadian Albums chart for the week beginning with March 31, 2018, while also featured at #161 on Billboard 200 year-ender chart.

Rob Simonsen's score was distributed by Lakeshore Records as Love, Simon (Original Motion Picture Score) and released along with the soundtrack album.

Release
Love, Simon premiered at the Mardi Gras Film Festival on February 27, 2018, and also screened at the Glasgow Film Festival and the Melbourne Queer Film Festival. The film was released by 20th Century Fox in the United States and Canada on March 16, 2018, and was scheduled to be released in other countries on various dates throughout 2018.

Following the film's release, several celebrities – including Jennifer Garner, Kristen Bell, Neil Patrick Harris, Joey Graceffa, Matt Bomer, Robbie Rogers, Benj Pasek, Tyler Oakley, Martin Gero, Andrew Rannells, and Jesse Tyler Ferguson – bought out theaters and offered free screenings of the film because they believed it conveyed an important message. Love, Simon is notable as the first film by a major Hollywood studio to focus on a gay teenage romance.

The film became available to pre-order on home video on January 17, 2018, was released digitally on May 29, 2018, and was released on 4K Blu-Ray, Blu-ray and DVD on June 12, 2018.

Reception

Box office
Love, Simon grossed $40.8million in the United States and Canada, and $25.4million in other territories, for a worldwide total of $66.3million, against a production budget of $10–17million. It is the 15th highest-grossing teen romance film since 1980, and the third-highest by 20th Century Fox after The Fault in Our Stars and Romeo + Juliet.

Love, Simon held early preview screenings on March 10 before its official release on March 16, where it grossed $800,000 from 927 theaters, which Deadline Hollywood considered "strong". In the United States and Canada, the film was released alongside Tomb Raider and I Can Only Imagine, and was projected to gross $10–12million from 2,401 theaters in its opening weekend. The film made $4.6million on its first day (including $850,000 from Thursday previews at 2,125 theaters). The film went on to debut at $11.8million, finishing fifth at the box office; 58% of its opening weekend audience was female and 59% was under 25. In its second weekend the film dropped 33% to $7.8million, finishing 7th, and in its third weekend made $4.8million, finishing ninth.

In the United Kingdom, the film debuted fourth at the box office, earning $1.6million. In Australia, the film debuted fourth at the box office, earning $916,697. In Brazil, the film debuted fourth at the box office, earning $804,567. In Mexico, the film debuted third at the box office, earning $982,391.

Critical response
The website's critical consensus reads, "Love, Simon hits its coming-of-age beats more deftly than many entries in this well-traveled genre – and represents an overdue, if not entirely successful, milestone of inclusion." On Metacritic, the film has a weighted average score of 72 out of 100, based on 38 critics, indicating "generally favorable reviews". Audiences polled by CinemaScore gave the film an average grade of "A+" on an A+ to F scale, one of fewer than 90 films in the history of the service to earn such a score.

Benjamin Lee of The Guardian gave the film four out of five stars, calling it a "hugely charming crowd-pleaser". Pete Hammond of Deadline Hollywood gave the film four out of five stars, stating that audiences "are guaranteed to fall in love with this sweet, funny coming-of-age film".

Molly Freeman of Screen Rant gave the film four out of five stars or an Excellent rating, stating that "Love, Simon is a funny, heartfelt, and truly touching teen romantic comedy that instantly becomes a modern classic for today's generation." Josh Winning of GamesRadar+ gave the film four out five stars, describing it as a "warm, sensitive and engaging coming-out-of-ager" and "one of the freshest teen-coms in ages".

Meredith Goldstein of The Boston Globe gave the film three and a half out of four stars and stated, "Love, Simon is a sweet, modern romantic comedy that manages to channel the teen movie classics of the late John Hughes, but only the good stuff." Colin Covert of the Star Tribune gave the film 3/4 stars and wrote, "If John Hughes had gone on to make a smart LGBT coming-of-age charmer, most likely it would resemble this."

Bruce Demara of the Toronto Star also gave it three out of four stars, stating "The casting is high quality, the script – with a tantalizing mystery at its heart – is particularly well-crafted and the story hits all the right emotional notes in delivering a funny, warm-hearted and life-affirming tale." Brian Truitt of USA Today gave the film three and a half out of four stars and wrote, "Young and old, jocks and nerds, geeks and freaks, and everyone in between should be able to find something to adore in Love, Simon."

Joyce Slaton of Common Sense Media gave the film four out of five stars, describing it as "tender, sweet, and affecting", with the film also receiving The Common Sense Seal, which recognizes movies that offer families an exceptional media experience. MJ Franklin of Mashable wrote that "Love, Simon feels like an instant classic that you're going to want to watch again and again."

Max Weiss of Baltimore gave Love, Simon three out of four stars, calling it a "sweet, funny, warm-hearted film".

Peter Debruge of Variety, while stating that the film is average in execution, praised the content as "groundbreaking on so many levels, not least of which is just how otherwise familiar it all seems". Jesse Hassenger of The A.V. Club gave the film a C+ and wrote that the film "is touching as a gesture", but as entertainment "it's nothing Degrassi hasn't done better".

Becky Albertalli, the author of the novel on which the film is based, watched an early cut and praised the film, stating: "It's funny and relevant and timeless and charming and honest and painful and so romantic. It says exactly what I wanted the book to say."

Accolades

Sequel television series

Although Berlanti indicated that, after witnessing the film's success, he would not necessarily be opposed to directing a sequel film based on the book's spin-off sequel, Leah on the Offbeat, stating "God willing that the movie is successful enough that people actually ask for something like that. I loved working with these people on this film so much. I would just like to spend more time with them, that would be good!" When asked about a sequel, Katherine Langford said "I mean, it's always a discussion of who would make it, but if the script was good and the filmmaker had a great vision, then I would be totally down. I'm always down to tell a good story."

On April 11, 2019, it was announced that a spin-off television series would premiere on Disney+. The series is not an adaptation of Leah on the Offbeat but rather a new story set at the same high school and follows closeted basketball player Victor and his already out-of-the-closet hipster crush, Benji.

On June 13, 2019, actress Ana Ortiz was cast to star as Isabel, Victor's mother. On August 15, 2019, the rest of the cast was revealed, with Michael Cimino leading the series as Victor, James Martinez as Victor's father Armando, Isabella Ferreira as Victor's sister Pilar, Mateo Fernandez as Victor's brother Adrian, Rachel Naomi Hilson as Victor's friend Mia, Bebe Wood as Mia's friend Lake, George Sear as Victor's love interest Benji, Anthony Turpel as Victor's best friend Felix, and Mason Gooding as cocky jock Andrew. Additionally, Nick Robinson would return as narrator and a producer of the series.

In February 2020, the seriesnow titled Love, Victorwas announced to be premiering on Hulu instead in June 2020. It was released on Disney+ in February 2021 in territories where the Star content hub is available.

References

External links
 
 
 

20th Century Fox films
2018 LGBT-related films
2018 romantic comedy-drama films
2010s coming-of-age comedy-drama films
2010s high school films
2010s teen comedy-drama films
2010s teen romance films
American coming-of-age comedy-drama films
American high school films
American romantic comedy-drama films
American teen comedy-drama films
American teen LGBT-related films
American teen romance films
Coming-of-age romance films
Films adapted into television shows
Films based on American novels
Films based on young adult literature
Films directed by Greg Berlanti
Films produced by Wyck Godfrey
Films scored by Rob Simonsen
Films set in Atlanta
Films shot in Atlanta
Gay-related films
LGBT-related comedy-drama films
LGBT-related coming-of-age films
LGBT-related romantic comedy films
LGBT-related romantic drama films
2010s English-language films
2010s American films